The 2013 World Artistic Gymnastics Championships were held in Antwerp, Belgium, from 30 September to 6 October 2013 at Antwerp's Sports Palace. Kōhei Uchimura won the men's all-around gold medal and finished the competition with four total medals. Simone Biles won the women's all-around title and also finished the competition with four medals.

Competition schedule
All times are CEST (UTC+2).

Medalists

Men's results

Individual all-around
The final was held on 3 October. Kōhei Uchimura won his fourth consecutive individual all-around world championship crown, outscoring silver medalist Ryohei Kato by 1.958 points. Uchimura became the first gymnast to win four world individual all-around titles. He posted the highest score on three of the six apparatuses.

Floor
The final was held on 5 October. Japan's Kenzo Shirai became the first gymnast to successfully perform a backward quadruple-twisting layout somersault (the Shirai or Shirai-Nguyen on floor), and a forward triple-twisting layout somersault (the Shirai 2 on floor) in the final of a major, and he secured the gold. At 17 years, 1 month and 11 days, Shirai also became the youngest male gymnast at the championships to take a gold medal, and the youngest ever male world champion on floor exercise.

Pommel horse
The final was held on 5 October. Kohei Kameyama of Japan won the gold medal.

Rings
The final was held on 5 October. Arthur Zanetti, the Olympic champion on this event, won the gold.

Vault
The final was held on 6 October. The Olympic vault champion, Yang Hak-Seon, took the gold. Shirai originated a new skill on this apparatus as well at these championships, the Shirai or Shirai-Kim on vault, or a Yurchenko (round off–back handspring entry onto platform) triple twist/full or triple-twisiting Yurchenko (TTY).

Parallel bars
The final was held on 6 October. Kōhei Uchimura of Japan and Lin Chaopan of China shared the gold medal.

Horizontal bar
The final was held on 6 October. Epke Zonderland, the reigning Olympic champion, had a routine "full of gravity-defying leaps" and won the gold medal.

Women's results

Individual all-around
The final was held on 4 October. The top two finishers were Simone Biles and Kyla Ross, both of the United States. It was the third time that the US won the World Championship all-around gold and silver medals. Ross led going into the final apparatus, floor exercise, but Biles had a higher difficulty score and overtook Ross to win the gold medal by 0.884 points. Russia's Aliya Mustafina, the 2010 champion in this event, won the bronze.

Vault
The final was held on 5 October. Defending champion McKayla Maroney received 15.724 points and won the gold medal. As the last gymnast to perform, she nearly stuck her Amanar vault for a 15.966, and then her Yurchenko half-on, front layout full off earned a score of 15.483. Simone Biles, who had won the all-around title the day before, won silver in this event. 2008 Olympic Vault Champion Hong Un Jong took the bronze.

Uneven bars
The final was held on 5 October. Kyla Ross, who had won the all-around silver medal the day before, won another silver in this event. Huang Huidan took the gold, and Olympic champion Aliya Mustafina took the bronze.

Balance beam
The final was held on 6 October. Aliya Mustafina won the gold medal, finishing ahead of Americans Kyla Ross and Simone Biles. All three filed petitions to change their difficulty scores but only Ross' and Biles' were accepted.

Floor
The final was held on 6 October. Simone Biles won her second gold and fourth total medal of the competition. 2006 World all-around champion Vanessa Ferrari took the silver. Romanian Olympic medalist Larisa Iordache got the bronze medal.

Qualification

Men's Qualification

Men's qualifications details for the remaining individual apparatus finals can be referenced on the website of USA Gymnastics.

Women's Qualification

Medal table

Men

Women

References

External links

 
2013
2013 in gymnastics
2013 in Belgian sport
International gymnastics competitions hosted by Belgium
Sports competitions in Antwerp
2013,Artistic Gymnastics World Championships
September 2013 sports events in Europe
October 2013 sports events in Europe